Connecticut elected its members September 21, 1818.  The delegation changed from seven Federalists to seven Democratic-Republicans due to the retirement of six incumbents and the party-change of the seventh.

See also 
 1818 Connecticut's at-large congressional district special election
 1818 and 1819 United States House of Representatives elections
 List of United States representatives from Connecticut

Notes 

1818
Connecticut
United States House of Representatives